Teymur Guliyev (25 November 1888, Jabrayil – 18 November 1965, Baku) was the chairman of the Council of People's Commissars of the Transcaucasian Socialist Federative Soviet Republic from 13 November 1937 to 28 March 1946.

See also
Prime Minister of Azerbaijan

References 

1888 births
1965 deaths
People from Jabrayil
Central Committee of the Communist Party of the Soviet Union members
Communist Party of the Soviet Union members
Expelled members of the Communist Party of the Soviet Union
Heads of the government of the Azerbaijan Soviet Socialist Republic
First convocation members of the Supreme Soviet of the Soviet Union
Second convocation members of the Supreme Soviet of the Soviet Union
Third convocation members of the Supreme Soviet of the Soviet Union
Recipients of the Order of Lenin
Recipients of the Order of the Red Banner of Labour
Azerbaijani communists
Azerbaijani politicians